William Gilmour is a British musician and artist who was an early member and keyboardist of rock band The Enid, before leaving to form his own band: Craft. He is now a retired music teacher having worked at Culloden Academy in Inverness. He is a contributing composer and performer for Francis Lickerish's band Secret Green.

References 

British rock keyboardists
Living people
People from Hamilton, South Lanarkshire
People from Inverness
Year of birth missing (living people)
The Enid members
Secret Green members